Moutoussamy is a surname. Notable people with the surname include: 

Ernest Moutoussamy (born 1941), French politician
John Moutoussamy (1922-1995), African-American architect
Lea Moutoussamy, Algerian fencer
Samuel Moutoussamy (born 1996), French footballer
Thierry Moutoussamy (born 1972), French musician, known as Lord Kossity